Amores may refer to:

 Amores (Ovid), the first book by the poet Ovid, published in 5 volumes in 16 BCE
 Amores (Lucian), a play by Lucian; also known as Erotes
 Erotes (mythology), known as Amores by the Romans
 Amores, a book of poetry by D. H. Lawrence
 Amores, a piece for percussion group and prepared piano composed by John Cage
 Amores (Mexico City Metrobús), a BRT station in Mexico City